Islet are a psychedelic pop band from Wales. They have been shorlisted for the Welsh Music Prize twice: in 2012, for Illuminated People, and in 2020, for Eyelet.

History
Islet were formed in Cardiff in 2009 by brothers Mark and John Thomas with Emma Daman (formerly of The Victorian English Gentlemens Club). After signing to Turnstile Music, the band released the mini albums Celebrate this Place and Wimmy in 2010, with their full-length debut album Illuminated People appearing in January 2012.

Discography

EPs 
Celebrate This Place (Shape/Turnstile, 2010)
Wimmy (Shape/Turnstile, 2010)
Liquid Half Moon EP (Shape 2016)

Studio albums 
Illuminated People (Shape/Turnstile, 2012)
Released by the Movement (Shape, 2013)
Eyelet (Fire Records (UK), 2020)

References

External links
Official Bandcamp
Shape Records label page

Welsh indie rock groups
British indie pop groups
Psychedelic pop music groups
Musical groups from Cardiff
Musical groups established in 2009